Paramachaerodus is an extinct genus of saber-tooth cat of the subfamily Machairodontinae, which was endemic to Europe and Asia during the late Miocene from 15 to 9 Ma.

Paramacheirodus is one of the oldest known true saber-toothed cats. Many fossils were discovered in Cerro de los Batallones, a Late Miocene fossil site near Madrid, Spain. One leopard-sized species is known, Paramachaerodus orientalis from the Turolian. A second species, Paramachairodus maximiliani, has been considered a synonym of Paramachaerodus orientalis by some authors, but was considered a valid species in the most recent systematic revision. That revision, based on an extensive morphological analysis, also determined that the species P. ogygia exhibited less derived sabertooth features than the other Paramachairodus species and should be assigned to a separate genus, Promegantereon. A third species, Paramachairodus transasiaticus, has recently been described based on analysis of new fossil material from the late Miocene localities of Hezheng, Gansu Province, China, and Hadjidimovo, Bulgaria. These specimens had sabertooth characteristics intermediate between those of P. ogygia and those of P. orientalis and P. maximiliani.

The shape of its limbs suggests that it may have been an agile climber, and could have hunted relatively large prey.

In 2022, a new species Paramachaerodus yingliangi was proposed based on fossils from northeastern China; the same paper also proposed separating Paramachaerodus schlosseri as the new type species and moving P. orientalis and P. maximiliani to the resurrected genus Pontosmilus.

References

External links
 Paramachairodus at the bluelion.org

Smilodontini
Miocene felids
Prehistoric carnivoran genera
Fossil taxa described in 1913